Luiz Fernando Claudino dos Santos (born 26 April 1982, in Ibiporã) is a Brazilian football goalkeeper who currently plays for Esteghlal Ahvaz in the Persian Gulf Pro League.

Club career
Before transferring to Aluminium Hormozgan in 2009, dos Santos played with several teams in Brazil, including Vasco da Gama and Caldense.

References

External links
 Persianleague Profile
 

1982 births
Living people
Brazilian footballers
Brazilian expatriate footballers
Tupi Football Club players
Associação Atlética Caldense players
Londrina Esporte Clube players
Ituano FC players
Expatriate footballers in Iran
Persian Gulf Pro League players
Azadegan League players
Aluminium Hormozgan F.C. players
Association football goalkeepers